IASR may refer to:

Institute of Advanced Scientific Research
International Academy of Sex Research